There are a number of sites on the Queensland Heritage Register in Toowoomba, Queensland, Australia. These include:
 24 Anzac Avenue, Newtown: Elphin (residence)
 57 Brook Street, North Toowoomba: The Downs Co-operative Dairy Association Limited Factory

 9 Boulton Street, Toowoomba City: Tawa
 80 Campbell Street, East Toowoomba: Whyembah
 32-36 East Street, Redwood: Glen Alpine
 4-6 Fernside Street, East Toowoomba: Fernside
 1B-3 Gladstone Street, Newtown: Gladstone House and Cottage
 Herries Street, Toowoomba City: St Luke's Anglican Church
 149 Herries Street, Toowoomba City: Soldiers Memorial Hall
 152 Herries Street, Toowoomba City: St Luke's Church Hall
 1 Hogg Street, Cranley: Baillie Henderson Hospital

 James Street, South Toowoomba: St Patricks Cathedral
 158 James Street, South Toowoomba: Toowoomba South State School
 43-79 Lindsay Street, East Toowoomba: Queens Park
 24-60 Margaret Street, East Toowoomba: Toowoomba Grammar School
 73 Margaret Street, East Toowoomba: Bishop's House
 90 Margaret Street, East Toowoomba: Old Toowoomba Court House
 124 Margaret Street, East Toowoomba: Toowoomba Technical College
 136 Margaret Street, Toowoomba City: Toowoomba Post Office
 159-167 Margaret Street, Toowoomba City: Strand Theatre
 245-253 Margaret Street, Toowoomba City: Exchange Building
 112 Mary Street, East Toowoomba: Gowrie House

 3 Mill Street, Toowoomba City: Carlton House
 11 Mort Street, Newtown: Toowoomba Maltings
 145 Mort Street, Toowoomba City: St James Church
 6 Munro Street, Harlaxton: Harlaxton House
 46 Neil Street, Toowoomba City: Toowoomba Court House
 50-52 Neil Street, Toowoomba City: Toowoomba Police Station Complex
 54 Neil Street, Toowoomba City: Wesley Uniting Church
 56 & 56A Neil Street, Toowoomba City: Empire Theatre
 15 Newmarket Street, Newtown: Ascot House
 8 Panda Street, Harristown: Smithfield House
 Pechey Street, South Toowoomba: Toowoomba Hospital
 9 Phillip Street, East Toowoomba: Millbrook
 344-376 Ramsay Street, Middle Ridge: Gabbinbar
 6 Range Street, Mount Lofty: Boyce Gardens
 Russell Street, Toowoomba City: Men's Toilet

 Russell Street, Toowoomba City: Toowoomba railway station
 2 Russell Street, Toowoomba City: Toowoomba Permanent Building Society
 19A Russell Street, Toowoomba City: Toowoomba Trades Hall
 112 Russell Street, Toowoomba City: St James Parish Hall
 120 Russell Street, Toowoomba City: Clifford House
 126 Russell Street, Toowoomba City: Kensington
 127 Russell Street, Toowoomba City: Wislet

 135 Russell Street, Toowoomba City: Vacy Hall

 Ruthven Street, Harlaxton: Tyson Manor
 251-267 Ruthven Street, Toowoomba City: Toowoomba Foundry
 269-291 Ruthven Street, Toowoomba City: Defiance Flour Mill
 381-391 Ruthven Street, Toowoomba City: Pigott's Building
 386-388 Ruthven Street, Toowoomba City: Karingal Chambers
 451-455 Ruthven Street, Toowoomba City: Alexandra Building
 456 Ruthven Street, Toowoomba City: White Horse Hotel
 541 Ruthven Street, Toowoomba City: Toowoomba City Hall
 corner of South Street and Anzac Avenue, Harristown: Drayton and Toowoomba Cemetery
 1 South Street, Rangeville: Geeumbi
 2 South Street, Rangeville: Rodway (house)
 68 Stephen Street, South Toowoomba: Cottage
 154 Stephen Street, Harristown: Redlands
 396 Tor Street, Newtown: Tor
 427 Tor Street, Newtown: Weetwood
 9-13 Tourist Road, East Toowoomba: Unara
 168 Tourist Road, Rangeville: Picnic Point and adjacent Parkland
 7 Warra Street & 30 Rome Street, Newtown: Oak Lodge and Spreydon

See also

History of Toowoomba, Queensland

References

Toowoomba, Queensland Heritage Register
Toowooma

Toowoomba